Michael Buchanan may refer to:

 Mike Buchanan (1932–2017), Canadian ice hockey player
 Mike Buchanan (politician) (born 1957), British men's rights activist, leader of the Justice for Men and Boys party
 Michael Buchanan (cricketer) (born 1983), Australian cricketer
 Michael Buchanan (American football) (born 1991), American football defensive end and linebacker
 House Shoes (Michael Buchanan; fl. from 1994), American hip hop producer and DJ